Eleonora Bargili was an Italian pastellist active during the eighteenth century. A nun at the convent of Santa Maria della Neve in Pistoia, she created an altarpiece of Francis de Sales for that institution. It is undated, but may have been done in conjunction with the establishment in 1739, of an Istituto di S. Francesco di Sales at the convent.

References

Italian women painters
18th-century Italian painters
18th-century Italian women artists
18th-century Italian Roman Catholic religious sisters and nuns
Nuns and art
Pastel artists
People from Pistoia